Weston is a city in Collin County, Texas, United States. The population was 563 at the 2010 census, and 283 at the 2020 United States census.

Geography

Demographics

At the census of 2000, there were 635 people, 235 households, and 204 families residing in the city. At the 2020 census, its population declined to 283.

In 2000, the racial and ethnic makeup of the city was 97.17% White, 0.16% Black or African American, 0.31% Asian, 2.05% from other races, and 0.31% from two or more races. Hispanic or Latino Americans of any race were 4.41% of the population. The racial and ethnic makeup in 2020 consisted of 244 non-Hispanic whites, 10 Black or African Americans, 2 Asian Americans, and 8 people of some other race. A total of 34 residents were Hispanic or Latino of any race.

From the 2000 census, there were 235 households, out of which 32.8% had children under the age of 18 living with them, 79.1% were married couples living together, 6.0% had a female householder with no husband present, and 12.8% were non-families. 11.5% of all households were made up of individuals, and 3.4% had someone living alone who was 65 years of age or older. The average household size was 2.70 and the average family size was 2.92.

In the city, the population was spread out, with 23.8% under the age of 18, 7.7% from 18 to 24, 29.0% from 25 to 44, 29.8% from 45 to 64, and 9.8% who were 65 years of age or older. The median age was 40 years. For every 100 females, there were 102.9 males. For every 100 females age 18 and over, there were 100.8 males.

The median income for a household in the city was $56,528, and the median income for a family was $59,375. Males had a median income of $44,107 versus $27,083 for females. The per capita income for the city was $25,440. About 2.3% of families and 3.8% of the population were below the poverty line, including 4.1% of those under age 18 and 2.7% of those age 65 or over. At the 2019 American Community Survey, its 94 households had a median income of $81,250.

Education

Weston is served by two school districts: Celina ISD and McKinney ISD.

The Texas Legislature designated Collin College as the community college for all of Collin County and for Celina ISD, in addition to some other parts of Denton County.

References

External links
City of Weston official website

Cities in Collin County, Texas
Cities in Texas
Dallas–Fort Worth metroplex